This is a list of killings by law enforcement officers in the People's Republic of China, including the special administrative regions of Hong Kong and Macau.

Notes

References

See also 
 Lists of killings by law enforcement officers

China
Violent deaths in China
Capital punishment in China
Lists of events in China
China
Law enforcement in China